EVH may refer to:
 Eddie Van Halen
 Ena/Vasp homology proteins
 Endoscopic vessel harvesting
 Eucapnic voluntary hyperventilation, a test for exercise-induced bronchoconstriction
 Evans Head Memorial Aerodrome, in New South Wales, Australia
 Uvbie language